Qus (older name , from ) is a city in the modern Qena Governorate, Egypt, located on the east bank of the Nile.

History

Naming

Its modern name is one of many borrowings in Egyptian Arabic from Coptic, the last living phase of Ancient Egyptian. In Graeco-Roman times, it was called Apollonopolis Parva or Apollinopolis Mikra, or Apollonos minoris.

During the Roman Empire it was renamed Diocletianopolis; and it corresponds, probably, to the Maximianopolis of the later Empire.

Overview
In the late Old Kingdom and First Intermediate Period, important people of Qus were buried at Naqada at the other side of the Nile. Here were found several stelae belonging to local governors of Qus, including those of Hetepi (priest).
Gesa was an important city in the early part of Egyptian history. Because at that time it served as the point of departure for expeditions to the Red Sea. The city gradually lost its importance, only to regain it in the 13th century with the opening of an alternate commercial route to the Red Sea. Since then, Qus replaced Qift as the primary commercial center for trading with Africa, India, and Arabia. It thus became the second most important Islamic city in medieval Egypt, after Cairo.

Today, Qus is the site of a major American/German commercial project to convert the waste products of sugar cane refining (bagasse) into paper products.

The modern population of Qus is around 300,000.

Main sights

Temple of Haroeris and Heqet
The temple of Haroeris (Horus) and Heqet was built during the Ptolemaic Period. Nowadays, only two ruined pylons of the temple remain.

The pylon shows scenes of Ptolemy X Alexander I harpooning hippopotami, presenting offerings to Horus, and offering crowns to both Horus and Heqet. The texts also include the cartouches of Ptolemy IX Soter II(called Lathyros) and his mother Cleopatra III. Near this site a green basalt naos was discovered. It was dedicated to Horus by Ptolemy II Philadelphus. The naos is presumed to have come from the temple as well.

See also
 List of cities and towns in Egypt

Notes

References

External links

Cities in ancient Egypt
Ancient Greek archaeological sites in Egypt
Roman sites in Egypt